Hurlingham is a commercial and residential neighbourhood in the city of Nairobi.

Location
Hurlingham is straddled by mostly the Agwings Kodhek Road. It ends at the intersection between Agwings Kodhek Road, Ring Road Kilimani, and Cotton Avenue. Yaya Centre, an upscale shopping mall, is a major landmark of the neighbourhood. It borders Kilimani Estate to the west, Upper Hill to the east and Caledonia Estate to the north. Electorally, Hurlingham is placed under Dagoretti North Constituency, which is partially  administratively placed within the larger sub-county of Westlands.

Overview
Hurlingham Estate was named after a sport of polo was introduced in British East Africa at around 1907. Hurlingham was considered a whites-only residential area by the British colonialists in the mid 20th century. It was not until the 1960s when it was racially integrated. The neighbourhood has historically been primarily low-density residential, but gradually grew into a mixed-use neighbourhood since the early 1990s; both retail and offices and the launch of Yaya Centre shopping mall.

Points of interest
 Yaya Centre, in Hurlingham, is a shopping mall with over 100 retail shops.
 Department of Defence Headquarters, along Valley Road.

References

Suburbs of Nairobi